Juraj Buček  (born 15 September 1973 in Humenné) is a former Slovak football goalkeeper who played for several clubs in Europe.

Club career
Buček began his professional football career with Chemlon Humenné in the Slovak Superliga. He had a spell in the Greek Super League with Skoda Xanthi F.C. and Olympiacos F.C.

References

 

1973 births
Living people
Sportspeople from Humenné
Slovak footballers
Slovakia international footballers
ŠK Futura Humenné players
Xanthi F.C. players
Olympiacos F.C. players
Aris Thessaloniki F.C. players
Slovak Super Liga players
Slovak expatriate footballers
Expatriate footballers in Greece
Association football goalkeepers